Shaun Garin Vandiver (born June 15, 1968) is a retired American college and professional basketball player and currently an assistant basketball coach for the University of Wyoming. Vandiver served as the head basketball coach at Emporia State University from 2011 to 2018. Born in Chicago, the Bolingbrook, Illinois native was selected 25th overall in the 1991 NBA Draft, from Hutchinson Community College and the University of Colorado Boulder. A 6'10" (2.08 m) and 240 lb (109 kg) power forward was also an outstanding basketball player in the European leagues in Italy (for Mangiaebevi Bologna in 1991–92 and Pfizer Reggio Calabria in 1994–95) and Spain (Caja Bilbao in 1995–96).

College career
Vandiver played one season for the Hutchinson Community College Blue Dragons, before transferring to the University of Colorado Boulder. He was the Big Eight Conference's rookie of the year in 1988, and was a two time First Team All Big 8 selection in 1990 and 1991. In his final season in 1990–91, he led Colorado to a third-place finish in the National Invitation Tournament. Prior to that, Colorado had not been to the National Invitation Tournament semifinals in 22 years. Vandiver was third on the Buffaloes' all-time scoring list until being surpassed in early 2008 by Richard Roby.

Professional career
Vandiver was selected 25th overall in the 1991 NBA Draft by the Golden State Warriors, but did not play for them. He wound up playing the next nine years for various teams in Europe.

Coaching career
In April 2011, Vandiver was named the head men's basketball coach at Emporia State University. Previously in the 2010–11 season, Vandiver was an assistant to head coach Leon Rice at Boise State. Prior to that he served as an assistant to Steve McClain (under whom he played at Hutchinson CC) at the University of Wyoming, a position he held since 2005. Vandiver was a graduate assistant coach with Wyoming in 2002–03, and as a full-time assistant coach at Bowling Green in 2003–04, and Northern Colorado in 2004–05. Vandiver returned to Wyoming as an assistant coach in April 2018.

Head coaching record

Personal
Vandiver has five children with his wife Danielle.

References

External links
 Biography – esuhornets.com

1968 births
Living people
African-American basketball coaches
African-American basketball players
American expatriate basketball people in France
American expatriate basketball people in Italy
American expatriate basketball people in Spain
American men's basketball coaches
American men's basketball players
Basketball coaches from Illinois
Basketball players from Chicago
Boise State Broncos men's basketball coaches
Bowling Green Falcons men's basketball coaches
CB Estudiantes players
CB Girona players
CB Gran Canaria players
Colorado Buffaloes men's basketball players
Élan Béarnais players
Emporia State Hornets basketball coaches
Fortitudo Pallacanestro Bologna players
Golden State Warriors draft picks
Junior college men's basketball players in the United States
Liga ACB players
Northern Colorado Bears men's basketball coaches
People from Bolingbrook, Illinois
Power forwards (basketball)
Sportspeople from Chicago
Viola Reggio Calabria players
Wyoming Cowboys basketball coaches
21st-century African-American people
20th-century African-American sportspeople